Absolute Power is a 1996 book by David Baldacci. It was made into a 1997 film starring Clint Eastwood.

Plot summary
An experienced burglar, Luther Whitney, breaks into a billionaire's house with the intent of robbing it. While there, he witnesses the President of the United States and the billionaire's wife having sex. However, their lovemaking turns violent and Secret Service agents burst in and kill the woman, which Whitney also sees.  The reason Whitney was able to witness the murder was because he was behind a large one-way mirror that was a secret door into a large closet where the billionaire would sit and watch when his wife had sex with another man.  Whitney escapes, but not before the Secret Service learns of his presence; they blame the wife's murder on Whitney. Whitney goes on the run from the President's agents while a detective tries to piece together the crime.

Characters

Luther Whitney
Whitney is a professional burglar who got caught three times. He personally witnessed the incident mentioned in the Plot Summary and ran for his life but later came back and endeavored to bring the real criminal to justice.

Kate Whitney
Kate is Luther's only daughter. Luther had been in jail during Kate's childhood which led to Kate being harsh on criminals, especially thieves and burglars. The police later used Kate to get to Luther which changed her outlook on her father and her own life.

Critical reception
Publishers Weekly called Baldacci "a first-rate storyteller who grabs readers by their lapels right away and won't let go until they've finished his enthralling yarn." Kirkus Reviews gave it a poor review, writing: "For all its arresting premise, an overblown and tedious tale of capital sins." Jonathan Kirsch, in the Los Angeles Times, was slightly more receptive, writing that "Baldacci is never subtle, but he succeeds in building up enough suspense to keep us reading, if only to find out exactly how evil all the president’s men (and women) will turn out to be."

See also

 Absolute Power (film)

References

1996 American novels
1996 debut novels
American crime novels
American novels adapted into films
American political novels
American thriller novels
Novels by David Baldacci
Novels set in Washington, D.C.
Political thriller novels
Warner Books books